The episodes of Kamen Rider W have two titles per episode matching the overall motif of the number two: a story arc title and a subtitle directly relating to the story of that episode. The Latin letter in the story arc title has a double meaning: the name of a Kamen Rider, Dopant, or an important character featured in the story arc and another word that indicates the theme of the arc. The series follows the hardboiled crime fiction genre, although the comedic nature of the series makes it more half-boiled, as its protagonist is described.

Episodes



References

See also

W